Jagannathan (1938 – 8 December 2012) was an Indian actor who worked in Malayalam cinema.

Biography
Jagannathan was born to Sekharan Nair in Changanassery in 1938. He did his primary education from Thuravoor L.P School, Vaikom Government School.  He got training from Rashtriya Anushasan Yojan at Rajasthan and won first rank in it. He worked as instructor at L.D.S Training Institute, Indore, Madhya Pradesh for four years. He also worked as Physical Education Officer at Neyattinkara Government High School, St. Joseph's High School, Thiruvananthapuram, Poojappura Government High School and at Javahar Bal Bhavan, Thiruvananthapuram. He held posts as Government Welfare Officer and Govenernment Sports Director Administrator.

Movie career
He was an active member of the Malayalam theatre scene along with G. Aravindan and Nedumudi Venu. He played the noted character of Aattappandaram in the play Avanavan Kadamba written by Kavalam Narayana Panicker and directed by Aravindan. Jagannathan also directed four plays: Pathanam, Parivarthanam, Karadi and Vivahalochana.

Jagannathan's film debut was in Oridathu (1986), directed by Aravindan. He acted in over 100 Malayalam films. Ardhanaari (2012) was his last film to be released before his death. Jagannathan also played roles in many television serials, including Kairalivilasam Lodge, which made him popular among Malayali households.

Death
Jagannathan died on 8 December 2012 at Poojappura in Thiruvananthapuram, Kerala.

Family
He is married to Saraswathi Amma. The couple have a daughter Rohini, and a son Chandrasekharan. Malayalam television serial director Sivamohan Thampi is his son-in-law.

Filmography 
 Pooram
 Gramathil Ninnu (1978) not released
 Oridathu (1986)
 Theetham (1986)
 Swathi Thirunal (1987)
 Sruthi (1987) as Achuthan Marar 
 Puravrutham (1988)
 Dasharatham (1989) as Sankaran Nair
 Chanakyan (1989) as Madhava Menon's Aide
 Utharam (1989) as Subrahmaniam 
 Artham (1989) as Bookshop Owner 
 Swagatham (1989) Vallabhai
 Mazhavilkavadi (1989) as Ubaid
 Appu (1990) as Thamarakshan 
 Samrajyam (1990) as Lakshmi's Father
 Kottayam Kunjachan (1990) as Mathayi 
 Marupuram (1990)
 Nale Ennundenkil (1990)
 Vachanam (1990)
 Souhrdam (1990) as Krishnan 
 Thudarkadha (1991) as Sankarankutty
 Koodikazhcha (1991) as Eenthapurayil Eenasu 
 Aanaval Mothiram (1991) as Annie's Father 
 Kadalora Kattu (1991) as Aouthakutty
Oru Prathyeka Ariyippu (1991) as Dasappan
 Aham (1992)
 Soorya Chakram (1992)
 Kingini (1992)
 kunukkitta kozhi
 Addehamenna Iddeham
 Pattanathil Sundaran
 Simhavaalan Menon
 Rajashilpi (1992)
 Ezhunnallathu
 Soorya Gayathri (1992) as Ramanathan
 Aayirappara (1993) as Chandrabhanu 
 Pravachakan (1993) as Chackochan 
 Devasuram (1993) as Poduval
 Thiruda Thuruda (1993)- Tamil as Astroleger
 Pidakkozhi Koovunna Noottandu (1994) as Venkiti 
  Avittam Thirunaal Aarogya Sriman (1995) as Sukumara Pillai 
 Thacholi Varghese Chekavar(1995)
 Manthrikante Pravu (1995)
 Mayoora Nritham (1996)
 Kalyana Unnikal (1997)
 The Truth (1998)
 Stalin Sivadas (1999) as Keshava Pilla
 Jeevan Masai (2001) as Shasthrikal
 Sravu (2001) as Kochayyappan
 Thenthulli (2001)
 Adheena (2002)
 Videsi Nair Swadesi Nair as Fr. Idikkula 
 Ente Hridayathinte Udama (2002)
 Punarjani (2003)
 Pattanathil Sundaran (2003) as Gopalakrishnan Nair
 Oru Pennum Randanum (2008)
 Pakal Nakshathrangal (2008)
 Patham Nilayile Theevandi (2009)
 Ardhanaari (2012)

TV serials
 Oridathorikkal
 Kathasamgamam
 Pattolaponnu
 Chamayam
 Take 4 OK
 Mookkuthiyum Manchadiyum	
 Panthirukulam
 Tharattu
 School Diary
 Draupadi
 Kairalivilasam Lodge (Doordarshan)
 Kadamattathu Kathanar (Asianet) 
 Mandan Kunju (Doordarshan)
 Vaitharani
 chandrodayam (Doordarshan)
 Punnakka Vikasana Corporation (Doordarshan)
 Ara Nazhika Neram (Amrita TV)
Vikramadithyan (Asianet)
Sneham(Surya)

Awards
 Kerala State Theatre Award for the second best actor (1985) - Aayiram Katham Akale
 Kerala State Award for the best supporting actor in a television serial (1999) - School Diary, Draupadi

References

External links
 
 Jagannadhan at MSI

Male actors from Kerala
1938 births
2012 deaths
Male actors in Malayalam cinema
Indian male film actors
Indian male stage actors
People from Changanassery
20th-century Indian male actors
21st-century Indian male actors
Indian male television actors
Male actors in Hindi television
Male actors in Malayalam television